The Deichtorhallen in Hamburg, Germany, is one of Europe's largest art centers for contemporary art and photography. The two historical buildings dating from 1911 to 1913 are iconic in style, with their open steel-and-glass structures. Their architecture creates a backdrop for spectacular major international exhibitions.

In 2003 the southern hall was dedicated to the medium of photography, creating the House of Photography. Since 2011, the two buildings at the interface of Hamburg's Kunstmeile and Hafencity have been supplemented by a satellite in Hamburg's Harburg district, the Sammlung Falckenberg.

History
Between 1911 and 1914, the "Deichtorhallen" ("the levee gate halls") were built as market halls on the grounds of the former Berliner Bahnhof railway station, Hamburg's counterpart to Berlin's Hamburger Bahnhof. They constitute one of the few surviving examples of industrial architecture from the transitional period between Art Nouveau and 20th century styles. The two halls are open steel structures, the northern hall is a longitudinal edifice boasting three naves and a 3,800 m2 footprint; the southern hall (1,800 m2) is a building with a lantern roof. Rupprecht Matthies created two "language cylinders" visitors can walk through for Deichtorplatz, which is also home to a Richard Serra sculpture. In the northern hall, there is a line of neon writing by Mario Merz and a "Blue Disc" by Imi Knoebel.

The Körber Foundation gifted the restored Deichtorhallen to the City of Hamburg. In 1989, they were assigned to a limited liability company: Deichtorhallen-Ausstellungs GmbH. On 9 November 1989, Deichtorhallen's international art exhibition program opened with the show "Einleuchten", curated by Harald Szeemann.

Deichtorhallen Hamburg has emerged as an exhibition center for photography and contemporary art with three pillars of activities, three institutions under the single Deichtorhallen brand. Since 2009, Dirk Luckow has been artistic director of Deichtorhallen Hamburg.

Exhibitions (selection)
 Wolfgang Tillmans (2001)
 Martin Parr (2004)
 Martin Munkácsi (2005)
 Jonathan Meese (2006)
 Georg Baselitz (2007)
 Erwin Wurm (2007)
 Fischli & Weiss (2008)
 F. C. Gundlach (2008)
 Lillian Bassman / Paul Himmel (2009)
 Herbert Tobias (2009)
 Katharina Fritsch (2009)
 Nobuyoshi Araki (2010)
 Poul Gernes (2010)
 Julia Stoschek Collection (2010)
 Gilbert & George (2011)
 Marilyn Minter (2011)
 Anselm Reyle (2012)
 Horizon Field Hamburg by Antony Gormley (2012)
 Sarah Moon (2015)

References

External links
 Official site of Deichtorhallen Hamburg

Culture in Hamburg
Buildings and structures in Hamburg-Mitte
Museums in Hamburg
Art museums established in 1989
Art museums and galleries in Germany
1989 establishments in West Germany
Tourist attractions in Hamburg
Art Nouveau architecture in Hamburg
Art Nouveau retail buildings
Commercial buildings completed in 1914